The Pre-Pottery Neolithic (PPN) represents the early Neolithic in the Levantine and upper Mesopotamian region of the Fertile Crescent, dating to  years ago, (10000 – 6500 BCE). It succeeds the Natufian culture of the Epipalaeolithic Near East (also called Mesolithic), as the domestication of plants and animals was in its formative stages, having possibly been induced by the Younger Dryas.

The Pre-Pottery Neolithic culture came to an end around the time of the 8.2-kiloyear event, a cool spell centred on 6200 BCE that lasted several hundred years. It is succeeded by the Pottery Neolithic.

Chronology

Pre-Pottery Neolithic A 

The Pre-Pottery Neolithic is divided into Pre-Pottery Neolithic A (PPNA 10000 – 8800 BCE) and the following Pre-Pottery Neolithic B (PPNB 8800 – 6500 BCE). These were originally defined by Kathleen Kenyon in the type site of Jericho (Palestine). The Pre-Pottery Neolithic precedes the ceramic Neolithic (Yarmukian culture, 6400 – 6200 BCE). At 'Ain Ghazal, in Jordan, the culture continued a few more centuries as the so-called Pre-Pottery Neolithic C culture.

Around 11000 years ago (9000 BCE), during the Pre-Pottery Neolithic A (PPNA), the world's first town, Jericho, appeared in the Levant.

Pre-Pottery Neolithic B 

The Pre-Pottery Neolithic is divided into Pre-Pottery Neolithic A (10000 – 8800 BCE) and the following Pre-Pottery Neolithic B (8800 – 6500 BCE). PPNB differed from PPNA in showing greater use of domesticated animals, a different set of tools, and new architectural styles.

Pre-Pottery Neolithic C 
Work at the site of 'Ain Ghazal in Jordan has indicated a later Pre-Pottery Neolithic C period. Juris Zarins has proposed that a Circum Arabian Nomadic Pastoral Complex developed in the period from the climatic crisis of 6200 BCE, partly as a result of an increasing emphasis in PPNB cultures upon domesticated animals, and a fusion with Harifian hunter-gatherers in the Southern Levant, with affiliate connections with the cultures of Fayyum and the Eastern Desert of Egypt. Cultures practicing this lifestyle spread down the Red Sea shoreline and moved east from Syria into southern Iraq.

Diffusion

Europe

Carbon 14 dating 

The spread of the Neolithic in Europe was first studied quantitatively in the 1970s, when a sufficient number of 14C age determinations for early Neolithic sites had become available. Ammerman and Cavalli-Sforza discovered a linear relationship between the age of an Early Neolithic site and its distance from the conventional source in the Near East (Jericho), thus demonstrating that, on average, the Neolithic spread at a constant speed of about 1 km/yr. More recent studies confirm these results and yield the speed of 0.6–1.3 km/yr at 95% confidence level.

Analysis of mitochondrial DNA 
Since the original human expansions out of Africa 200,000 years ago, different prehistoric and historic migration events have taken place in Europe. Considering that the movement of the people implies a consequent movement of their genes, it is possible to estimate the impact of these migrations through the genetic analysis of human populations. Agricultural and husbandry practices originated 10,000 years ago in a region of the Near East known as the Fertile Crescent. According to the archaeological record this phenomenon, known as "Neolithic", rapidly expanded from these territories into Europe. However, whether this diffusion was accompanied or not by human migrations is greatly debated. Mitochondrial DNA –a type of maternally inherited DNA located in the cell cytoplasm- was recovered from the remains of Pre-Pottery Neolithic B (PPNB) farmers in the Near East and then compared to available data from other Neolithic populations in Europe and also to modern populations from South-Eastern Europe and the Near East. The obtained results show that substantial human migrations were involved in the Neolithic spread and suggest that the first Neolithic farmers entered Europe following a maritime route through Cyprus and the Aegean Islands.

South Asia 

The earliest Neolithic sites in South Asia are Bhirrana in Haryana, dated to 7570-6200 BC, and Mehrgarh, dated to between 6500 and 5500 BC, in the Kachi plain of Baluchistan, Pakistan; the site has evidence of farming (wheat and barley) and herding (cattle, sheep and goats).

There is strong evidence for causal connections between the Near-Eastern Neolithic and that further east, up to the Indus Valley. There are several lines of evidence that support the idea of a connection between the Neolithic in the Near East and in the Indian subcontinent. The prehistoric site of Mehrgarh in Baluchistan (modern Pakistan) is the earliest Neolithic site in the north-west Indian subcontinent, dated as early as 8500 BCE. Neolithic domesticated crops in Mehrgarh include more than barley and a small amount of wheat. There is good evidence for the local domestication of barley and the zebu cattle at Mehrgarh, but the wheat varieties are suggested to be of Near-Eastern origin, as the modern distribution of wild varieties of wheat is limited to Northern Levant and Southern Turkey. A detailed satellite map study of a few archaeological sites in the Baluchistan and Khybar Pakhtunkhwa regions also suggests similarities in early phases of farming with sites in Western Asia. Pottery prepared by sequential slab construction, circular fire pits filled with burnt pebbles, and large granaries are common to both Mehrgarh and many Mesopotamian sites. The postures of the skeletal remains in graves at Mehrgarh bear a strong resemblance to those at Ali Kosh in the Zagros Mountains of southern Iran. Despite their scarcity, the 14C and archaeological age determinations for early Neolithic sites in Southern Asia exhibit
remarkable continuity across the vast region from the Near East to the Indian Subcontinent, consistent with a systematic eastward spread at a speed of about 0.65 km/yr.

In South India, the Neolithic began by 6500 BC and lasted until around 1400 BC when the Megalithic transition period began. South Indian Neolithic is characterized by Ash mounds from 2500 BC in Karnataka region, expanded later to Tamil Nadu.

Relative chronology

See also 

 History of pottery in the Southern Levant
 Pre-history of the Southern Levant
Proto-city

References

Further reading 
 J. Cauvin, Naissance des divinités, Naissance de l’agriculture. La révolution des symboles au Néolithique (CNRS 1994). Translation (T. Watkins) The birth of the gods and the origins of agriculture (Cambridge 2000).
 Ofer Bar-Yosef, The PPNA in the Levant – an overview. Paléorient 15/1, 1989, 57-63.

 
Neolithic cultures of Asia
Archaeological cultures of the Near East